Junior is a 2008 documentary film chronicling a year in the life of Baie-Comeau Drakkar of the Quebec Major Junior Hockey League. Co-directed by Isabelle Lavigne and Stéphane Thibault and produced by the National Film Board of Canada, the film was named Best Documentary: Society at the Prix Gémeaux and Best Canadian Feature Documentary at the Hot Docs Canadian International Documentary Festival.  It also won the Sheffield Doc/Fest Audience Award in 2009

The film was shot in Direct Cinema style and follows players, managers, trainers, shareholders, agents and recruiters over the course of an entire season.

References

External links
Watch Junior at NFB.ca

2008 films
2008 documentary films
National Film Board of Canada documentaries
Quebec films
Documentary films about ice hockey
Prix Gémeaux-winning shows
Quebec Major Junior Hockey League
Canadian ice hockey films
Canadian sports documentary films
2000s Canadian films